Thomas Gradgrind is the notorious school board Superintendent in Dickens's 1854 novel Hard Times who is dedicated to the pursuit of profitable enterprise. His name is now used generically to refer to someone who is hard and only concerned with cold facts and numbers.

In the story 
In the story, Gradgrind was the father of five children, naming them after prominent utilitarians such as Robert Malthus. He also ran a model school where young pupils were treated as machines, or pitchers which were to be filled to the brim with facts. This satirised the Scottish philosopher James Mill who attempted to develop his sons into perfect utilitarians.

His physical description personified this characterisation of the rigid and insistent pedagogue:

In a famous passage, a visiting official asks one of Gradgrind's students, "Suppose you were going to carpet a room. Would you use a carpet having a representation of flowers upon it?" The character Sissy Jupe replies, ingenuously, that she would because, "If you please, Sir, I am very fond of flowers."

References 

Gradgrind
Literary characters introduced in 1854
Fictional schoolteachers
Fictional British people
Male characters in literature